Lene Mørk Christiansen (born 26 October 1979) is a retired Danish badminton player.

Achievements

European Junior Championships
Girls' doubles

Mixed doubles

IBF Grand Prix 
The World Badminton Grand Prix sanctioned by International Badminton Federation since 1983.

Women's doubles

IBF International 
Women's doubles

Mixed doubles

References

External links 

1979 births
Living people
Danish female badminton players